The geranium miner bee (Andrena geranii) is a species of miner bee in the family Andrenidae. Another common name for this species is the geranium andrena. It is found in North America.

References

Further reading

External links

 

geranii
Articles created by Qbugbot
Insects described in 1891